Baldi Olier was born in 1953 in Romania. He is a flamenco guitarist described by The Jerusalem Post as "Israel's undisputed king of flamenco".

References

 Official site

1953 births
Living people
Romanian emigrants to Israel